Pierre C. O. Lisk (born 22 November 1971) is a Sierra Leonean sprinter. He competed in the men's 200 metres at the 1996 Summer Olympics.

References

External links
 

1971 births
Living people
Athletes (track and field) at the 1996 Summer Olympics
Sierra Leonean male sprinters
Olympic athletes of Sierra Leone
Place of birth missing (living people)